CIG could stand for:

Organizations
 Cambridge Information Group, a privately held global investment firm focusing on information services, education and technology
 Confederación Intersindical Galega (Galician InterTrade Union Confederation) is a Galician Trade union with the legal status of more representative trade union in Spain
 Columbia Insurance Group, a private US insurance company
 Central Intelligence Group, the predecessor to the Central Intelligence Agency, active between 1946 and 1947
 Cloud Imperium Games, a PC game software developer
 CIG, New York Stock Exchange stock symbol for Companhia Energetica de Minas Gerais S.A.

Others
 The IEEE Conference on Computational Intelligence and Games, an annual conference on computational intelligence research related to game applications
 Cig, a colloquial term for a cigarette
 The Canadian Improv Games, an annual nationwide Improvisation competition for high school students in Canada
 Corpus Inscriptionum Graecarum (Berlin, 1825–1877), the first attempt at a standard corpus of the Greek inscriptions of Antiquity
 Computational Infrastructure for Geodynamics, an organization that develops and maintains open-source software for computational geophysics
 IATA airport code for Craig-Moffat Airport
 Cig, a village in Tăşnad Town, Satu Mare County, Romania
 Copper indium gallium selenide solar cells, a kind of a flexible, thin film solar cell
 Career Integration Grants, part of Marie Curie Actions European research grants
 Converter interfaced generation